The Hong Kong national cricket team is the team that represents independent Hong Kong in international competition. It played its first match in 1866 and has been an associate member of the International Cricket Council (ICC) since 1969.

Hong Kong played its first One Day Internationals in the 2004 Asia Cup, and in January 2014 was granted ODI status until 2018, as a result of finishing third in the 2014 Cricket World Cup Qualifier. The team gained Twenty20 International status in November 2013, as a result of qualifying for the 2014 ICC World Twenty20. Hong Kong lost their ODI status in March 2018 after losing to the Netherlands in a play-off match during the 2018 Cricket World Cup Qualifier. They did, however, play two further ODI matches at the 2018 Asia Cup in September 2018 after winning the 2018 Asia Cup Qualifier, as the ICC announced that all matches played at the finals would have ODI status.

Hong Kong has played in every ICC Trophy/World Cup Qualifier tournament, with the exceptions of the 1979 and 2005 events. It has also taken part in two ICC Intercontinental Cup tournaments, in 2005 and in 2015–17, and in two ICC T20 World Cup tournaments, in 2014 and 2016.

In April 2018, the ICC decided to grant full Twenty20 International (T20I) status to all its members. Therefore, all Twenty20 matches played between Hong Kong and other ICC members after 1 January 2019 will be a full T20I.

History

Early years

The sport was introduced to Hong Kong by the British, with the first recorded game taking place in 1841, and the Hong Kong Cricket Club being founded ten years later. The Cricket Club (playing as Hong Kong) played a number of Interport matches against sides on the Chinese mainland, the first taking place against Shanghai in 1866, and in 1890 played Ceylon (now Sri Lanka) for the first time.

There were only 23 survivors, which included only 2 of the 13 team members. The other 11 members of the team were lost, including Surrey cricketer John Dunn.

1948 saw the last game against Shanghai.Jack Chegwyn led the first international team to Hong Kong in 1952, and the first tour by an MCC team was in 1966. The MCC, captained by Mike Smith played one match against the national side, winning by 74 runs. In 1969 the Hong Kong Cricket Association became an associate member of the International Cricket Council, cricket's global ruling body.

ICC membership

The year after gaining ICC membership, the Hong Kong national side played against an MCC side captained by Tony Lewis, drawing the game, but it was not until the 1982 ICC Trophy when the Hong Kong team next played. At that tournament the Hong Kong team, which featured future England Test cricketer Dermot Reeve, failed to progress beyond the first round.

Hong Kong took part in the following three ICC Trophy tournaments, again failing to progress beyond the first round in 1986, reaching the plate competition in 1990 and the second round in 1994. They then played in the inaugural ACC Trophy tournament in 1996, failing to progress beyond the group stage after losing to Bangladesh and Fiji.

In 1997, Hong Kong returned to Chinese control. In the same year, the national team finished eighth in the ICC Trophy. They played in the ACC Trophy again in 1998, losing to Malaysia in the semi-finals.

21st century

2000–2009

In 2000, Hong Kong reached the final of the ACC Trophy, where they lost to the United Arab Emirates. Nonetheless, this earned them qualification for the 2002 Asia Cup (which was subsequently moved to 2004), and thus their first taste of One Day International cricket.

Hong Kong fared poorly in the 2001 ICC Trophy, going out in the group stage having achieved only one win, against Papua New Guinea. In 2002, they reached the semi-finals of the ACC Trophy, again losing to the United Arab Emirates.

At the 2004 Asia Cup, held in Sri Lanka, Hong Kong were drawn alongside Test nations Bangladesh and Pakistan. They lost both matches heavily, despite restricting Bangladesh to 221/9 in the first match.

Also in 2004, Hong Kong failed to progress beyond the first round of the ACC Trophy after losing in the group stages to Oman and Bahrain, missing out on qualification for the 2005 ICC Trophy in Ireland. They also reached the final of the ACC Fast Track Countries Tournament, losing to the United Arab Emirates. Hong Kong played in the Intercontinental Cup for the first time in 2005. They lost to the UAE and drew with Nepal, failing to reach the semi-finals. They finished last in the fast-track nations tournament the same year.

In 2006, Hong Kong again lost to the United Arab Emirates in the final of the ACC Trophy, and finished fourth in the ACC Premier League. The following year, they travelled to Darwin, Australia to take part in Division Three of the World Cricket League, finishing fifth, relegating them to Division Four for 2008.

In October/November 2007, Hong Kong took part in the inaugural ACC Twenty20 Cup held in Kuwait, where they played in Group B against the United Arab Emirates, Singapore, Kuwait and Saudi Arabia. Hong Kong finished 4th in their group and failed to make to the semi-finals stage.

In June 2008, Hong Kong took part in the Asia Cup in Pakistan. They failed to progress beyond the group stage to the Super Four stage, as they lost both of their group A matches against India and Pakistan convincingly.

In October 2008, Hong Kong travelled to Dar-es-Salaam, Tanzania to participate in Division Four of the World Cricket League. Hong Kong won four group matches against; Fiji, Italy, Jersey and the hosts but lost twice to Afghanistan in their group match and the Final. Hong Kong's top two finish resulted in their promotion back to Division Three.

2010–present

In 2011 they hosted the Division Three and won it defeating Papua New Guinea in the finals to qualify for Division Two to be held in the United Arab Emirates. Then in Division Two they came 4th qualifying as HPP member and for 2014 Cricket World Cup Qualifier in New Zealand. .

In 2013 the UAE hosted the ICC T20 Qualifier where Hong Kong came 6th by beating Papua New Guinea and just enough to qualify for ICC T20 World Cup 2014 held in Bangladesh.

In 2014, New Zealand hosted the ICC 50 over world cup qualifier where Hong Kong came third place despite not qualifying for 2015 ICC cricket world cup, they still achieved an ODI status with Papua New Guinea.

In March 2014 Hong Kong beat the host Bangladesh in the 2014 ICC World Twenty20 by two wickets with two balls remaining but could not make it to the next stage of super 10 having lost the two earlier matches to Afghanistan and Nepal

Hong Kong first ODI win against a full member came on 8 March 2018 defeating Afghanistan in 2018 Cricket World Cup Qualifier.

Grounds

Tournament history

T20 World Cup

ICC Trophy / World Cup Qualifier

T20 World Cup Qualifier

2012: 11th place
2013: 6th place
2015: 4th place
2019: 7th place
2022: 6th place

ICC Intercontinental Cup

World Cricket League

2007 Division Three: 5th place
2008 Division Four: 2nd place
2009 Division Three: 4th place
2011 Division Three: Champions
2011 Division Two: 4th place
2019 Division Two:6th place

Asia Cup

1983 to 1995 inclusive: Did not participate
1997: Did not qualify
2000: Did not qualify
2004: First round
2008: First round 
2010: Did not qualify
2012: Did not qualify
2014: Did not qualify
2016: Did not qualify
2018: First round
2022: Qualified

Asia Cup Qualifier 
2016: 4th out of 4 teams (Did not qualify for 2016 Asia Cup)
2018: Winner (Qualified for 2018 Asia Cup)
2022: Winner (Qualified for 2022 Asia Cup)

ACC Eastern Region T20
 2018: Did not participate
 2020: Runner up (Qualified for 2020 Asia Cup Qualifier)

ACC Trophy

1996: First round
1998: semi-finals
2000: Runners up
2002: semi-finals
2004: First round
2006: Runners up
2008 (Elite): Won
2010 (Elite): 3rd place
2012: 5th place

ACC Premier League

2014: 5th place

ACC Twenty20 Cup

2007: First round
2009: 10th place
2011: Runners up
2013: 4th place

ACC Fast Track Countries Tournament

2004/05: Runners-up
2005/06: 5th place
2006/07: 4th place

Asian Games

2010: Quarter-finals
2014: 4th place

Current squad
This lists all the players who have played for Hong Kong in the past 12 months or has been part of the latest One-day or T20I squad. Updated as of 2 September 2022.

Players

Coaching staff

Coaching history
1993–1994:  Dermot Reeve
1997:  David Trist
2000:  Adam Hollioake
2001:  Andy Moles
2001–2002:  Lal Jayasinghe
2004–2007:  Robin Singh
2007:  Sameer Dighe
2007–2009:  Aftab Habib
2009–2010:  Afzaal Haider
2010–2015:  Charlie Burke
2015–2019:  Simon Cook
2019–2022:  Trent Johnston
2023–present:  Simon Willis

Records

International Match Summary – Hong Kong

Last updated 12 March 2023.

One Day Internationals

 Highest team total: 323/4 v Papua New Guinea, 8 December 2017 at ICC Academy Ground, Dubai
 Highest individual score: 143*, Anshuman Rath v Papua New Guinea, 8 December 2017 at ICC Academy Ground, Dubai
 Best individual bowling figures: 4/10, Kinchit Shah v Papua New Guinea, 17 March 2018 at Harare Sports Club, Harare

Most ODI runs for Hong Kong

Most ODI wickets for Hong Kong

Highest individual innings in ODI 

Best bowling figures in an innings in ODI 

ODI record versus other nations

Records complete to ODI #4039. Last updated 18 September 2018.

Twenty20 Internationals

 Highest team total: 186/8 v. Papua New Guinea on 14 July 2022 at Bulawayo Athletic Club, Bulawayo.
 Highest individual score: 122, Babar Hayat v. Oman on 19 February 2016 at Fatullah Osmani Stadium, Fatullah.
 Best individual bowling figures: 5/16, Haroon Arshad v. Nepal on 1 March 2020 at Terdthai Cricket Ground, Bangkok.

Most T20I runs for Hong Kong

Most T20I wickets for Hong Kong

T20I record versus other nations

Records complete to T20I #2022. Last updated 12 March 2023.

International records/World records
Jamie Atkinson was the first player (either male or female) born in the 1990s to play in ODI cricket.
Ryan Campbell who formerly played for Australia in ODIs, became the oldest player in T20I cricket to make his T20I debut at the age of 44 and 30 days.
Holds the record for the highest ODI partnership for any wicket by an associate nation (174 for the first wicket between Nizakat Khan and Anshuman Rath v India)
Hong Kong set the record for taking the longest time duration to lose their first wicket in an ODI match (34.1 overs against India at the 2018 Asia Cup)
Babar Hayat holds the joint record for taking the most catches in a single T20I as a fielder (4) along with Darren Sammy, Ajinkya Rahane, Peter Borren, Corey Anderson and Dinesh Chandimal.
 Babar Hayat's 122 is also the highest individual score by a player from associate nation in a T20I.

See also
Cricket Hong Kong
List of Hong Kong ODI cricketers
List of Hong Kong Twenty20 International cricketers
Hong Kong national cricket captains
Hong Kong women's cricket team

References

External links
Hong Kong Cricket Association
Hong Kong Cricket Team

Cricket in Hong Kong
National cricket teams
Cricket
Hong Kong in international cricket